The Dreamcast VGA Box (also known generally as a DC VGA adapter or DC VGA cable) is an accessory for Sega's Dreamcast video game console that allows it to connect to a video display such as a computer monitor or an HDTV set through a VGA port. Because the Dreamcast hardware can produce a VGA-compatible video signal natively, this connection provides improved picture quality compared to standard composite video or S-Video connections, along with support for progressive scan video.

Sega released the original VGA Box as an official accessory, but many third-party versions were also produced and sold worldwide in various form factors.

Most games for the Dreamcast are VGA-compatible, while various workarounds exist to enable VGA output from many of the games that do not feature official support.

Functionality

When pins 6 and 7 on the Dreamcast's A/V out port are connected to the ground pin (such as when a VGA box is connected to the console and externally switched to VGA mode), the Dreamcast system internally switches to VGA mode, displaying a 720x480 image (480p progressive scan, at a standard EDTV resolution) in RGBHV at 31 kHz, which allows it to connect to a computer monitor or EDTV/HDTV set with a VGA input.

The official VGA Box consists of a rectangular black plastic case, bearing a VGA out port and a 3.5 mm minijack for stereo audio output on one side, and an A/V output jack breakout panel (S-Video, composite, and RCA stereo audio jacks) on the other, for switching output either to a typical computer monitor and speakers/headphones or to a typical TV.

Most third-party versions are functionally identical to Sega's model besides cosmetic differences, but some simplified designs lack the additional A/V breakout and output switch. These units can only be used for VGA and audio output. Some of these designs are streamlined to the point that no extra housing is required beyond the cable jacket and the connectors; such units are described generically as DC VGA cables.

One enhanced model, the Performance-branded VGA Adapter for Dreamcast produced by InterAct, additionally features a VGA input port and stereo minijack input for PC video and audio pass-through, with automatic source switching when the Dreamcast system is powered on and off. This enables a computer or other daisy-chained video game console with VGA output to remain connected to the same monitor and speakers as the Dreamcast simultaneously, without swapping cables or using additional switches for both VGA video and 3.5 mm stereo minijack audio.

It is also possible to modify a Dreamcast to add the same VGA functionality to the console itself, obviating the need for a standalone VGA box.

Compatibility

Software
Most Dreamcast games are compatible with the VGA Box. Incompatible games will normally present an error message upon boot. All Dreamcast games can use a VGA box's S-Video and composite ports when the box is switched to TV mode, meaning one does not have to swap cables to play VGA-incompatible games as long as a display is also connected to one of these ports.

There are a handful of European and North American games that did not include the necessary flag within the boot sector on the disc ('IP.BIN'), thus preventing the Dreamcast from booting in VGA mode. Common workarounds include unplugging the VGA Box while booting a game, or temporarily switching the VGA Box into TV mode while booting a game, or using a boot disc such as DC-X.

Elements of some sprite-based games that were originally designed for interlaced display may appear less detailed when displayed in progressive mode due to the lack of scanlines softening the image. However, these games are officially considered compatible with the VGA Box because they can be played normally in VGA mode, and were thus branded as compatible on packaging and marketing materials.

Hardware and accessories
Dreamcast VGA boxes are compatible with Dreamcast systems from all regions, since all consoles are capable of producing the appropriate video signal. NTSC and PAL systems will produce images at the same resolution and horizontal scan rate when running similar compatible software.

Dreamcast light guns will work with VGA or other connections when using a direct-view CRT VGA display or a multisync, significantly-bright CRT projector. They will not function with LCD, LED, and plasma screens, or digital projectors, regardless of the connection used.

Digital displays
The VGA Box can be connected to an HDTV or PC monitor's DVI port with a simple passive adapter, as long as the port is DVI-A or DVI-I compatible.

It is also possible to convert the VGA output of the Dreamcast to HDMI or DVI-D via an active VGA to HDMI converter. However, since this is an analog-to-digital video conversion, the picture quality will depend on the processor in the converter and/or display, especially if any image scaling is performed. Such processing may also introduce or worsen display latency.

Post Dreamcast discontinuation
Demand for Dreamcast VGA boxes has risen among console owners in the years following the discontinuation of the Dreamcast due to an overall increase in the usage of HDTVs and computer monitors since then, as such displays increasingly lack standard S-Video and/or composite video connections. Accordingly, prices for Dreamcast VGA boxes on the second-hand market have increased as well, particularly for discontinued premium models. Based on this continuing demand, older and new third-party models also remain available from both retro game accessory companies and individual hobbyists selling homemade designs.

Other video game consoles released shortly after the Dreamcast, such as the PlayStation 2, early revisions of the Nintendo GameCube, and Xbox, supported progressive scan through YPbPr component video, although relatively few PlayStation 2 titles took advantage of the feature compared to Dreamcast and the others.

Various VGA accessories and independent hacks were produced for these consoles, mostly by third-party manufacturers and hobbyists. However, since none of these consoles were capable of producing a native RGBHV signal at 31 kHz for standard VGA output, these devices were generally designed around an outboard color space transcoder and/or scan converter. The most common and inexpensive of these devices, as with most similarly low-end general purpose signal converters, generated a VGA signal from composite or S-Video, resulting in poor quality. This would remain a problem for modern TVs until integrated plug-and-play HDMI adapters were manufactured and made available by third-party companies. 

The complexity, cost, and lack of software support for such accessories led to far lower VGA usage compared to the Dreamcast. However, since these consoles supported YPbPr component video natively, they were easier to use with typical EDTVs and HDTVs that may have lacked VGA support. Later consoles widened support for progressive scan by featuring component video, VGA, and/or HDMI connection options.

See also
 List of Dreamcast games

References

External links
 
DCTP - Dreamcast VGA Box

Sega hardware
VGA